Harriet Owen (born 16 December 1993) is a British professional racing cyclist, who currently rides for UCI Women's Continental Team .

Career
Born in Kirtlington, Oxfordshire, Owen was educated at Marlborough School, Woodstock.

In 2019 she took third place in the Armed Forces Cycling Classic in the Crystal Cup behind Kendall Ryan (Team TIBCO-Silicon Valley Bank) and Natalie Redmond (Fearless Femme Racing p-b Altam).

See also
 List of 2015 UCI Women's Teams and riders

References

External links

1993 births
Living people
English female cyclists
Sportspeople from Oxfordshire